The 2014 AMJ Campbell Shorty Jenkins Classic was held from September 18 to 21 at the Brockville Country Club in Brockville, Ontario as part of the 2014–15 World Curling Tour. Both the men's and women's events were held in a round robin format. The purse for the men's event was CAD$45,400, while the purse for the women's event was CAD$18,000.

On the men's side, the defending Olympic champion Brad Jacobs rink from Sault Ste. Marie defeated the newly formed Adam Casey rink from Charlottetown, to win their second straight "Shorty" title. On the women's side, the Sherry Middaugh rink from Coldwater, Ontario also won their second Shorty title, defeating Scotland's Eve Muirhead to win the event.

Men

Teams
The teams are as follows:

Standings
Final round-robin standings

Playoffs

Women

Teams
The teams are as follows:

Round-robin standings

Final round-robin standings

Playoffs

References

External links

2014
AMJ Campbell Shorty Jenkins Classic
AMJ Campbell Shorty Jenkins Classic
AMJ Campbell Shorty Jenkins Classic